Chang'an is the traditional name of Xi'an. The site had been settled since Neolithic times, during which the Yangshao culture was established in Banpo, in the city's suburbs. Furthermore, in the northern vicinity of modern Xi'an, Qin Shi Huang of the Qin dynasty, China's first emperor, held his imperial court, and constructed his massive mausoleum guarded by the Terracotta Army.

From its capital at Xianyang, the Qin dynasty ruled a larger area than either of the preceding dynasties. The imperial city of Chang'an during the Han dynasty was located northwest of today's Xi'an. During the Tang dynasty, the area that came to be known as Chang'an included the area inside the Ming Xi'an fortification, plus some small areas to its east and west, and a substantial part of its southern suburbs. Thus, Tang Chang'an was eight times the size of the Ming Xi'an, which was reconstructed upon the site of the former imperial quarters of the Sui and Tang city. During its heyday, Chang'an was one of the largest and most populous cities in the world. Around AD 750, Chang'an was called a "million man city" in Chinese records, with modern estimates putting it at around 800,000–1,000,000 within city walls. According to the census in 742 recorded in the New Book of Tang, 362,921 families with 1,960,188 persons were counted in Jingzhao Fu, the metropolitan area including small cities in the vicinity.

Han period

The Han capital was located 3 km northwest of modern Xi'an. As the capital of the Western Han, it was the political, economic and cultural center of China. It was also the eastern terminus of the Silk Road, and a cosmopolitan metropolis. It was a consumer city, a city whose existence was not primarily predicated upon manufacturing and trade, but rather boasted such a large population because of its role as the political and military center of China. By 2 AD, the population was 246,200 in 80,000 households. This population consisted mostly of the scholar gentry class whose education was being sponsored by their wealthy aristocratic families. In addition to these civil servants there was a larger underclass to serve them.

Initially, Emperor Liu Bang decideded to build his capital at the area south of Luo River, which according to Chinese geography was in modern Luoyang. This location was the site of the holy city Chengzhou, capital of Eastern Zhou. However, the strategic military value of a capital located in the Wei Valley became the deciding factor for locating the new capital. To this end, it is recorded c 200 BC he forcibly relocated thousands of clans in the military aristocracy to this region. The purpose was twofold. First, it kept all potential rivals close to the new Emperor, and second, it allowed him to redirect their energy toward defending the capital from invasion by the nearby Xiongnu. His adviser Liu Jing described this plan as weakening the root while strengthening the branch.

After the necessary political structure was set up, the area of the capital was divided into three prefectures and construction began. At its founding in 195 BC, the population of Changan was 146,000. During the reign of Emperor Wu of Han, the diplomat Zhang Qian was dispatched westward into Central Asia. Subsequently, Chang'an city became the Asian gateway to Europe as the point of departure of the Silk Road. On 4 October 23 AD, Chang'an was captured and sacked during a peasant rebellion. The emperor, Wang Mang was killed and decapitated by the rebels two days later. After the Western Han period, the Eastern Han government settled on Luoyang as the new capital. Chang'an was therefore also sometimes referred to as the Western Capital or Xijing in some Han dynasty texts. In 190 AD during late Eastern Han, the court was seized and relocated back to Chang'an by the notorious Prime Minister Dong Zhuo, as it was a strategically superior site against the mounting insurgency formed against him. After Dong's death (192) the capital was moved back to Luoyang in August 196, and to Xuchang in autumn 196. By this time, Chang'an was already regarded as the symbolic site of supreme power and governance.

City walls

The 25.7 km long city wall was initially 3.5 m wide at the base tapering upward 8 m for a top width of 2 m. Beyond this wall, a 6.13 m wide moat with a depth of 4.62 m was spanned by 13.86 m long stone bridges. The wall was later expanded to 12–16 m at base and 12 m high. The moat was expanded to 8 m wide and 3 m deep. The expansion of the wall was likely a solution to flooding from the Wei River. The entire city was sited below the 400 m contour line which the Tang Dynasty used to mark the edge of the floodplain.

Twelve gates with three gateways each, according with the ritual formulas of Zhou dynasty urban planning, pierced the wall. These gates were distributed three 
a side and from them eight 45 m wide main avenues extended into the city. These avenues were also divided into three lanes aligned with the three gateways of each gate. The lanes were separated by median strips planted with pine, elm, and scholar trees. Bachengmen Avenue was an exception with a width of 82 m and no medians. Four of the gates opened directly into the palaces.

City structure
The overall form of the city was an irregular rectangle. The ideal square of the city had been twisted into the form of the Big Dipper for astrological reasons, and also to follow the bank of the Wei River. The eight avenues divided the city into nine districts. These nine main districts were subdivided into 160 walled 1×1 li wards. About 50-100 families lived in each ward. Historically, Chang'an grew in four phases: the first from 200 to 195 BC when the palaces were built; the second 195-180 BC when the outer city walls were built; the third between 141 and 87 BC with a peak at 100 BC; and the fourth from 1 BC-24 AD when it was destroyed.

The Xuanpingmen gate was the main gate between the city and suburbs. The district north of the Weiyang Palace was the most exclusive. The main market, called the Nine Markets, was the eastern economic terminus of the Silk Road. Access to the market was from the Northeast and Northwest gates, which were the most heavily used by the common people. The former connect with a bridge over the Wei River to the northern suburbs and the latter connected with the rest of China to the east. An intricate network of underground passages connected the imperial harem with other palaces and the city. These passages were controlled by underground gatehouses and their existence was unknown.

First phase
In 200 BC after marking the boundaries of the three prefectures, which comprised the metropolitan region of Xianyang, Liu Bang appointed Xiao He to design and build the new capital. He chose to site the city on ruins of the Qin Dynasty Apex Temple (formerly, Xin Palace). This old Qin palace was meant to be the earthly mirror of Polaris, the apex star, where the heavenly emperor resided. This site thus represented the center of the earth lying under the center of heaven with an axis mundi running upward from the imperial throne to its heavenly counterpart. The ruins were greatly expanded to 7×7 li in size and renamed Changle Palace (长乐宫; 長樂宮; Chánglè Gōng). Two years later, a new palace called Weiyang Palace (未央宮; Wèiyāng Gōng) was constructed 5×7 li. Prime minister Xiao He convinced Liu Bang that both the excessive size and multiplicity of palaces was necessary to secure his rule by creating a spectacle of power.

Second phase
In 195 BC, his son, Emperor Hui of Han began the construction of the walls of Chang'an and finished them in September 191 BC. The grid north of the palaces was built at this time with a 2° difference in alignment to the grid of the palaces. The city remained quite static after this expansion.

Third phase
Emperor Wu began a third phase of construction which peaked on 100 BC with the construction of many new palaces. He also added the nine temples complex south of the city, and built the park. In 120 BC, Shanglin Park, which had been used for agriculture by the common people since Liu Bang was sealed off, was turned into an imperial park again. In the center of the park was a recreation of the three fairy islands in Kunming Lake.

Palaces
Changle Palace (长乐宫; 長樂宮; Chánglè Gōng) Also called the East Palace. It was built atop the ruins of Qin Dynasty Apex Temple (Xin Gōng). After Liu Bang it was used as the residence of the Empress Regent. The 10,000 m wall surrounded a square 6 km2 complex. Important halls of the palace included: Linhua Hall, Changxin Hall, Changqiu Hall, Yongshou Hall, Shenxian Hall, Yongchang Hall, and the Bell Room.
Weiyang Palace (未央宮; Wèiyāng Gōng) Also known as the West Palace. The official center of government from Emperor Huidi onwards. The palace was a walled rectangle 2250×2150 m enclosing a 5 km2 building complex of 40 halls. There were four gates in the wall facing a cardinal direction. The east gate was used only by nobility and the north one only by commoners. The palace was sited along the highest portion of the ridgeline on which Chang'an was built. In, fact the Front Hall at the center of the palace was built atop the exact highest point of the ridge. The foundation terrace of this massive building is 350×200×15 m. Other important halls are: Xuanshi Hall, Wenshi Hall, Qingliang Hall, Qilin Hall, Jinhua Hall, and Chengming Hall. Used by seven dynasties this palace has become the most famous in Chinese history.
Gui Palace Built as an extension of the harem built in 100 BC
North Palace A ceremonial center built in 100 BC
Mingguang Palace Built as a guesthouse in 100 BC
Epang Palace (阿房宮; ē-páng gōng)
Jianzhang Palace Built in 104 BC in Shanglin Park. It was a rectangle 20×30 li with a tower 46 m high. The name means palace of establishing eternal rules.
Boliang Terrace

Jin, Sixteen Kingdoms and Northern Dynasties period
Chang'an was briefly the capital of the Western Jin dynasty from 312 to 316. It was also the capital of Former Zhao (318–329), Former Qin (351–385) and Later Qin (384–417). In 417, a century after the Western Jin lost Chang'an, the city was reconquered by Liu Yu of Eastern Jin, who founded the Liu Song dynasty in 420. The city was lost to Northern Wei by 439. When Northern Wei split in two, Chang'an became the capital of Western Wei (535–557), and also of its successor state Northern Zhou (557–581).

Sui and Tang periods

Both Sui and Tang empires occupied the same location. In 582, Emperor Wen of the Sui dynasty sited a new region southeast of the much ruined Han Dynasty Chang'an to build his new capital, which he called Daxing (大興, "Great Prosperity"). Daxing was renamed Chang'an in the year 618 when the Duke of Tang, Li Yuan, proclaimed himself the Emperor Gaozu of Tang. Chang'an during the Tang dynasty (618–907) was, along with Constantinople (Istanbul) and Baghdad, one of the largest cities in the world. It was a cosmopolitan urban center with considerable foreign populations from other parts of Asia and beyond. This new Chang'an was laid out on a north–south axis in a grid pattern, dividing the enclosure into 108 wards and featuring two large marketplaces, in the east and west respectively. Every day, administrators of the two marketplaces would beat gongs three hundred times in the morning and evening to signify the start and stop of business. People who lived in the wards were not allowed to go outside after curfew. Officials with higher ranking had the privilege to live closer to the central avenue. Chang'an's layout influenced the city planning of several other Asian capitals for many years to come. The Japanese built their ancient capitals, Heijō-kyō (today's Nara) and later Heian-kyō or Kyoto, modeled after Chang'an in a more modest scale, yet was never fortified. The modern Kyoto still retains some characteristics of Sui-Tang Chang'an. Similarly, the Korean Silla dynasty modeled their capital of Gyeongju after the Chinese capital. Sanggyeong, one of the five capitals of the state of Balhae, was also laid out like Chang'an.

Much of Chang'an was destroyed during its repeated sacking during the An Lushan Rebellion and several subsequent events. Chang'an was occupied by the forces of An Lushan and Shi Siming, in 756; then taken back by the Tang government and allied troops in 757. In 763, Chang'an was briefly occupied by the Tibetan Empire. In 765, Chang'an was besieged by an alliance of the Tibetan Empire and the Uyghur Khaganate. Several laws enforcing segregation of foreigners from Han Chinese were passed during the Tang dynasty. In 779, the Tang dynasty issued an edict which forced Uighurs in the capital, Chang'an, to wear their ethnic dress, stopped them from marrying Chinese females, and banned them from pretending to be Chinese. Between 783 and 784, Chang'an was again occupied by rebels during the Jingyuan Rebellion. In 881, Chang'an was occupied by Huang Chao. In 882, the Tang dynasty briefly regained control of Chang'an. However, the Tang forces, although welcomed by the inhabitants, looted Chang'an before being driven back by the forces of Huang Chao. In revenge, Huang Chao conducted a systematic slaughter of the inhabitants after retaking the city. Chang'an was finally retaken by the Tang government in 883. However, in 904, Zhu Quanzhong ordered the city's buildings demolished and the construction materials moved to Luoyang, which became the new capital. The residents, together with the emperor Zhaozong, were also forced to move to Luoyang. Chang'an never recovered after the apex of the Tang dynasty, but there are some monuments from the Tang era still standing.

After Zhu Quanzhong moved the capital to Luoyang, Youguojun was established in Chang'an, with Han Jian being the Youguojun Jiedushi. Han Jian rebuilt Chang'an on the basis of the old Imperial City. Much of Chang'an was abandoned and the rebuilt Chang'an, called "Xincheng (lit. new city)" by the contemporary people, was less than 1/16 of the old Chang'an in area.

Layout of the city

The areas to the north that jutted out like appendages from the main wall were the West Park, the smaller East Park, and the Daming Palace, while the southeasternmost extremity of the main wall was built around the Serpentine River Park that jutted out as well. The West Park walled off and connected to the West Palace (guarded behind the main exterior wall) by three gates in the north, the walled-off enclosure of the Daming Palace connected by three gates in the northeast, the walled-off East Park led in by one gate in the northeast, and the Serpentine River Park in the southeast was simply walled off by the main exterior wall, and open without gated enclosures facing the southeasternmost city blocks. There was a Forbidden Park to the northwest outside of the city, where there was a cherry orchard, a Pear Garden, a vineyard, and fields for playing popular sports such as horse polo and cuju (ancient Chinese football). On the northwest section of the main outer wall there were three gates leading out to the Forbidden Park, three gates along the western section of the main outer wall, three gates along the southern section of the main outer wall, and three gates along the eastern section of the main outer wall. Although the city had many different streets and roads passing between the wards, city blocks, and buildings, there were distinct major roads (lined up with the nine gates of the western, southern, and eastern walls of the city) that were much wider avenues than the others. There were six of these major roads that divided the city into nine distinct gridded sectors (listed below by cardinal direction). Streets and roads of these widths allowed for efficient fire breaks in the city of Chang'an. For example, in 843, a large fire consumed 4,000 homes, warehouses, and other buildings in the East Market, yet the rest of the city was at a safe distance from the blaze (which was largely quarantined in East Central Chang'an). The citizens of Chang'an were also pleased with the government once the imperial court ordered the planting of fruit trees along all of the avenues of the city in 740.

Pools, streams, and canals

Within the West Park was a running stream and within the walled enclosure of the West Palace were two running streams, one connecting three ponds and another connecting two ponds. The small East Park had a pond the size of those in the West Palace. The Daming Palace and the Xingqing Palace (along the eastern wall of the city) had small lakes to boast. The Serpentine River Park had a large lake within its bounds that was bigger than the latter two lakes combined, connected at the southern end by a river that ran under the main walls and out of the city.

There were five transport and sanitation canals running throughout the city, which had several water sources, and delivered water to city parks, gardens of the rich, and the grounds of the imperial palaces. The sources of water came from a stream running through the Forbidden Park and under the northern city wall, two running streams from outside the city in the south, a stream that fed into the pond of the walled East Park, which in turn fed into a canal that led to the inner city. These canal waterways in turn streamed water into the ponds of the West Palace; the lake in the Xingqing Palace connected two canals running through the city. The canals were also used to transport crucial goods throughout the city, such as charcoal and firewood in the winter.

Locations and events during the Tang dynasty

Southwestern Chang'an
Locations and events in the southwest sector of the city included:
15 walled and gated wards
9 Buddhist monasteries
2 Taoist abbeys
14 Family shrines
1 Inn
1 Graveyard
A mansion where the owner carefully exhumed and reburied the remains of a long-dead military general because the grave was too close to the home's outhouse.
A large wooden Chinese pagoda tower that once stood at a monastery in this sector of the city, which held the supposed 'Buddha's teeth' brought by a pilgrim monk who traveled from India.

South Central Chang'an

Locations and events in the south central sector of the city included:
20 walled and gated wards
3 Buddhist monasteries
7 Taoist abbeys
11 Family shrines
1 Inn
An event in 815 where assassins murdered Chancellor Wu as he was leaving the eastern gate of the northeasternmost ward in south central Chang'an; the event took place just before dawn.
An event in 849 where an imperial prince was impeached from his position by officials at court for erecting a building that obstructed a street in the northwesternmost ward in south central Chang'an.
The infamous rebel An Lushan's garden
A garden with a pavilion where graduate students of the Advanced Scholar's Exam could hold 'peony parties'.
A walled ward with an empty field; in the seventh century it was originally a place where slaves, horses, cattle, and donkeys could be sold, but the entire ward was eventually transformed into a military training ground for crossbowmen to practice.
A special garden that provided food for the imperial crown prince's household.
A government garden that supplied pear-blossom honey, amongst other natural goods.

Southeastern Chang'an
Locations and events in the southeast sector of the city included:
13 walled and gated wards
9 Buddhist monasteries
3 Taoist abbeys
5 Family shrines
2 Inns
1 Graveyard
The Serpentine River Park, which had one of the Buddhist monasteries and one of the family shrines of the southeastern sector of the city within its grounds.
A medicinal garden for the heir apparent was located in a northern walled ward of this southeast sector of the city. A pastry shop stood by the north gate of the same ward, along with the site of an ancient shrine where citizens came every third day of the third moon and ninth day of the ninth month.
A ward to the north of this southeast city sector had half of its area designated as a graveyard.
A purportedly haunted house
A large monastery with ten courtyards and 1897 bays; this monastery was home to the Giant Wild Goose Pagoda (built in 652), which still stands today at a height of 64 m tall. Graduate students of the Advanced Scholars Exam would come here to this monastery in order to inscribe their names. This same city ward also had a large bathhouse, an entertainment plaza, an additional monastery which had its own pond, and a mansion that had its own bathhouse.
A ward with another garden pavilion for graduate students to hold their 'peony parties'.
An inn that was attached to the rapid relay post office.
An apricot grove where graduate students could celebrate their success with feasts.

West Central Chang'an

Locations and events in the west central sector of the city included:
11 walled and gated wards (including the large marketplace ward)
22 Buddhist monasteries
2 Taoist abbeys
2 Family shrines
3 Large water ponds
The West Market; its surface area covered the size of two regular city wards, and was divided into 9 different city blocks. It sported a Persian bazaar that catered to tastes and styles popular then in medieval Iran. It had numerous wineshops, taverns, and vendors of beverages (tea being the most popular), gruel, pastries, and cooked cereals. There was a safety deposit firm located here as well, along with government offices in the central city block that monitored commercial actions.
The offices for Chang'an County, the western half of the city.
The mansion of a Turkic prince.
The main office of Chang'an City's mayor.
A bureau for managing the households of princes.
An event in 613 where a family threw their gold into the well of their mansion because they feared the city government would confiscate it.
A firm that rented hearses and other equipment for funerals, along with hiring exorcists.
An event in 813 where a sow in a pig sty gave birth to a deformed piglet that had one head, three ears, two connected bodies, and eight different legs.
An event every day where the West Market (and East Market) would open at noon, announced by the 300 strikes on a loud drum, while the markets would close one hour and three quarters before dusk, the curfew signaled by the sound of 300 beats to a loud gong. After the official markets were closed for the night, small night markets in residential areas would then thrive with plenty of customers, despite government efforts in the year 841 to shut them down.

Central Chang'an
Locations and events in the central sector of the city included:
16 walled and gated wards
17 Buddhist monasteries
6 Taoist abbeys
1 Official temple
3 Family shrines
3 Locations for Provincial Transmission Offices
3 Inns
2 Graveyards
A court for imperial musicians
A minister's mansion that had a 'pavilion of automatic rain', that is, air conditioning by the old Han Dynasty invention of technician Ding Huan's (fl. 180 AD) rotary fan.
An event where a scholar was once injured on the head here by a cuju football, and out of pity for his plight, the emperor gave him a personal gift of twenty-five pints of drinking ale.
An event in 720 where the walls of one ward partially collapsed during a heavy storm.
A mansion belonging to Princess Taiping (died 713).
An event where a dwarf lady magician was said to provide the illusion of changing herself into a bamboo stalk and a skull.
The main Capital Schools, which were the Sons of State Academy, the Grand Learning Academy, and Four Gates Academy.
An assortment of other colleges for law, mathematics, and calligraphy.
A ward that had the largest number of entertainment plazas in the city.
A mansion home that was valued at 3 million Tang-era copper coins in the ninth century.
Another mansion that had a pavilion of plastered walls covered with an aromatic herb from Central Asia
The Small Wild Goose Pagoda, which still stands today.
A shop that sold fancy pastries
The Pavilion of Buddha's Tooth, located in a monastery where graduate students of the Advanced Scholars Exam could enjoy their 'cherry feasts' in honor of their academic success.
A government-run mint for casting copper-coin currency
A small field for playing horse polo

East Central Chang'an

Locations and events in the east central sector of the city included:
11 walled and gated wards
11 Buddhist monasteries
7 Taoist abbeys
1 Family shrine
1 Foreign place of worship (ex: churches, synagogues, etc.)
4 Locations for Provincial Transmission Offices
3 Inns
1 Graveyard
1 Large water pond
The East Market; like the West Market, this walled and gated marketplace had nine city blocks and a central block reserved for government offices that regulated trade and monitored the transactions of goods and services. There was a street with the name "Ironmongers' Lane", plenty of pastry shops, taverns, and a seller of foreign musical instruments.
The North Hamlet (Many of the city's entertainers, musicians, and courtesans, densely populated this quarter. Aside from the fact that they were not prostitutes, the Chinese courtesans were more or less similar to the Japanese geisha, and unlike the bar and tavern maids they had excellent table manners, polite mode of speech and behavior, and were reserved for entertaining the elite of society.
The Offices of Wannian County, the eastern half of the city
The main office of the Municipal Archives
The government bureau of the Directorate for Astronomy
An event in 775 where a Uyghur Turk stabbed a man to death in broad daylight in the East Market before being arrested in the marketplace shortly after. However, his Uyghur chieftain named Chixin or Red Heart broke into the county prison and freed the murderous culprit, wounding several wardens in the process.
A mansion of a princess with a large polo playing field in the backyard
An event where Emperor Gaozong of Tang (r. 649–683) once held the wedding feast here for the marriage ceremony of his daughter Princess Taiping.
The beer brewery of Toad Tumulus Ale.
An event in 788 where a gang of four thieves killed their arresting officer and fled the city.
An event where the assassins of Chancellor Wu hid in the bamboo groves of a mansion in this sector of the city after the murder.
A Buddhist monastery with an entertainment plaza
A home of a 'face reader' (physiognomist) where daily flocks of people came to have their fortunes told.
A mansion bestowed by the emperor to An Lushan (who became the most infamous rebel during the Tang era) in 750 that was converted into a Buddhist abbey after his demise. There was also a garden in a separate ward designated for An Lushan.
A mansion of a high-ranking general in the mid-8th century that was recorded to have 3,000 inhabitants of the extended family living on the premises.
A Zoroastrian Fire-Temple
An event where the imperial court demoted an official because it was discovered that he had assembled a large number of female entertainers here in a dwelling that was not his home.
An event in the ninth century where three maidservants committed suicide by leaping into a well and drowning once they heard the rebel Huang Chao was ransacking their mistress's mansion.

Northwestern Chang'an
Locations and events in the northwest sector of the city included:
12 walled and gated city wards
27 Buddhist monasteries
10 Taoist abbeys
1 Official Temple
1 Family shrine
6 Foreign places of worship (Ex: Church, synagogue, etc.)
1 Inn
1 Graveyard
The military barracks for the Divine Strategy Army.
A shrine for Laozi's father
Three Zoroastrian Fire-Temples
Three Persian Nestorian-Christian churches of worship
The office of the Inexhaustible Treasury
An event in 828 where a eunuch commanded fifty wrestlers to arrest 300 commoners over a land dispute, whereupon a riot broke out in the streets.
The home of An Jinzang, who cut his belly open with a knife in order to defend Emperor Ruizong of Tang against charges of treason.
A mansion of Princess Anle
The Inexhaustible Treasury; in 713, Emperor Xuanzong liquidated the highly lucrative Inexhaustible Treasury, which was run by a prominent Buddhist monastery in Chang'an. This monastery collected vast amounts of money, silk, and treasures through multitudes of anonymous rich people's repentances, leaving the donations on the premises without providing their name. Although the monastery was generous in donations, Emperor Xuanzong issued a decree abolishing their treasury on grounds that their banking practices were fraudulent, collected their riches, and distributed the wealth to various other Buddhist monasteries, Taoist abbeys, and to repair statues, halls, and bridges in the city.

North Central Chang'an
Locations and events in the north central sector of the city included:
Large gated walls connected to the West Palace and the main outer walls of the city
24 walled and gated wards
14 Different armed guard units in 6 different wards
The August Enceintes; this large walled compound of 24 wards was the Administrative City, where the various offices and main bureaus of the central government were located (in front of the southern walls of the lavish West Palace).
The headquarters for the Service for Supreme Justice (Supreme court).
The Imperial factories
An event in 713 where a large carnival was held along the main avenue lined against the southern wall of the West Palace
The Imperial stables and hay fields for horses
The government halls for civil and military examinations
The Imperial ancestral shrine

Northeastern Chang'an
Locations and events in the northeast sector of the city included:
14 walled and gated wards
13 Buddhist monasteries
4 Taoist abbeys
1 Family shrine
3 Locations for Provincial Transmission Offices
1 Inn
The Xingqing Palace; once a Buddhist monastery, it was converted to an Imperial palace in the early eighth century. Within the walled and gated grounds there was a large lake, two streams, an aloeswood pavilion, and an archery hall.
A large carriage park where officials visiting the Daming Palace could safely leave their horse-drawn vehicles for the day.
An entertainment ward in this sector that was considered to have the finest singers in the city, and another with the finest dancers.
An event where Empress Wu once donated one of her dressing rooms to a monastery here
An event where a eunuch who converted his mansion into a monastery held a feast where he demanded each guest to celebrate by striking the cloister's bell and donating 100,000 strings of cash.
An event in 730 where Emperor Xuanzong of Tang had four palace halls dismantled and reassembled as halls and gates for a Taoist abbey, the grounds of which was formally a large garden for the Bureau of Agriculture.
A residence for princes in the ward forming the northeast corner of the city
An event in 835 where palace troops captured rebel leaders in a tea shop that were planning a palace coup d'état against the chief court eunuchs.
An event in the early ninth century where the emperor spent 2 million strings of cash to purchase the former mansion of a venerated minister so that the dwelling could be returned to the minister's pious grandson.
A mansion of Princess Tongchang that had a water well lined with a railing made of pure gold and silver.
A court for imperial musicians
A large playing ground as a horse polo field
An event in 756 where the occupying rebel An Lushan ordered Sun Xiaozhe to have eighty three princesses, their husbands, and parties of Yang Guozhong and Gao Lishi murdered at Zongren Fang in reprisal for his already executed son An Qingzong.
A workshop for a maker of musical instruments
An event where a renowned but drunken artist painted an entire mural in one night at the north gate of a Buddhist monastery in the southwesternmost ward of this city sector.
A spot in the south central ward of this city sector where girls often played cuju football under a tree beside the road.
A street where the emperor would organize public entertainments to celebrate his birthday

West Palace

The West Palace to the north included:
An archery hall
Polo grounds
Elaborate Gardens
Five large water ponds and three different streams
A cuju football field
A drum tower
A bell tower
The residence of the Crown Prince, dubbed the 'East Palace'
The Flank Court, where women were incarcerated for the crimes of their husbands and other menfolk of the family they remained loyal to.
The school for palace ladies
The Seat of the Eunuch Agency

West Park
The West Park grounds included:
A river stream
Three gates leading into the West Palace
Ice pits for refrigerating foods during the spring and summer

Daming Palace
The Daming Palace grounds included:
Double walled gates at the north end leading out of the city, and one walled gate at the south end leading into the city
A large lake
An archery hall
A bathhouse
A storehouse for musical instruments
A drum tower
A bell tower
A cuju football field
A cockfighting arena
Academy of music for the actors and performers in the Pear Garden Troupe
A separate entertainment ward

East Park
The East Park grounds included:
A large pond
Two streams (one leading into the park from under the wall, one feeding water into a city canal)
A cuju (traditional Chinese soccer) field

Tallies
For different buildings and locations in the entire city, the total numbers for each were:
111 Buddhist monasteries
41 Taoist abbeys
38 family shrines
2 official temples
10 city wards having one or multiple provincial transmission offices
12 inns
6 graveyards
7 official foreign-religion churches

Citywide events
Citywide events of Chang'an include:
Festivals of traditional Chinese holidays celebrated throughout the city (and empire) included:
New Year; the grandest of all festivals, and a seven-day holiday period for government officials. Civil officials, military officers, and foreign emissaries gathered first in the early hours of the morning to attend a levee, an occasion where omens, disasters, and blessings of the previous year would be reviewed, along with tribute of regional prefectures and foreign countries presented. It was also an opportunity for provincial governors to present their recommended candidates for the imperial examination. Although festival ceremonies in Chang'an were lavish, rural people in the countryside celebrated privately at home with their families in age old traditions, such as drinking a special wine, Killing Ghosts and Reviving Souls wine, that was believed to cure illnesses in the following year.
Lantern Festival; a three-day festival held on the 14th, 15th, and 16th days of the first full moon. This was the only holiday where the government lifted its nightly curfew all across the city so that people could freely exit their wards and stroll about the main city streets to celebrate. Citizens attempted to outdo one another each year in the amount of lamps and the size of lamps they could erect in a grand display. By far the most prominent was the one in the year 713 erected at a gate in Chang'an by the recently abdicated Emperor Ruizong of Tang.
Lustration; this one-day festival took place on the third day of the third moon (dubbed the "double-three"), and traditionally was meant to dispel evil and wash away defilement in a river with scented aromatic orchis plants. By the Tang era it had become a time of baudy celebration, feasting, wine drinking, and writing poetry. The Tang court annually served up a special batch of deep fried pastries as dessert for the occasion, most likely served in the Serpentine River Park.
Cold Food Festival; this solar-based holiday on April 5 (concurrent with the Qingming Festival) was named so because no fires were allowed to be lit for three days, hence no warmed or hot food. It was a time to respect one's ancestors by maintaining their tombs and offering sacrifices, while a picnic would be held later in the day. It was also a time for fun in outdoor activities, with amusement on swing sets, playing cuju football, horse polo, and tug of war. In the year 710, Emperor Zhongzong of Tang had his chief ministers, sons-in-law, and military officers engage in a game of tug of war, and purportedly laughed when the oldest ministers fell over. The imperial throne also presented porridge to officials, and even dyed chicken and duck eggs, similar to the practice on Easter in the Western world.
Fifth Day of the Fifth Moon; this one-day holiday dubbed the Dragon Boat Festival was held in honor of an ancient Chinese statesman Qu Yuan (-278 BC) from the State of Chu. Ashamed that he could not save the dire affairs of his state or his king by offering good council, Qu Yuan leaped into a river and committed suicide; it was said that soon after many went out on the river in boats in a desperate attempt to rescue him if still alive. This act turned into a festive tradition of boarding a dragon boat to race against other oarsmen, and also to call out Qu's name, still in search of him. The type of food commonly eaten during the Tang period for this festival was either glutinous millet or rice wrapped in leaves and boiled.
Seventh Night of the Seventh Moon; this was a one-day festival that was held in honor of the celestial love affair with deities associated with the star Altair (the male cow-herd deity) in the constellation Aquila and the star Vega (the female weaver maid deity) in the constellation Lyra. For this holiday, women prayed for the enhancement of their skills at sewing and weaving. It was during this holiday that the emperor's concubines threaded polychrome thread into needles with nine eyes, while facing the moon themselves (in a ritual called "praying for skill [in sewing and weaving]").
Fifteenth Day of the Seventh Moon; this holiday was called All Saints' Feast, developing from the legend Mulian Rescues His Mother. in which the bodhisattva savior Mulian who had discovered his mother paying for her sinful ways while in purgatory filled with hungry ghosts. According to the tale, she starved there because any food that she put into her mouth would turn into charcoal. Then it was said that she told the Buddha to make an offering with his clergy on the fifteenth day of the seventh month, a virtuous act that would free seven generations of people from being hungry ghosts in Hell as well as people reborn as lower animals. After Mulian was able to save his own mother by offerings, Mulian convinced the Buddha to make the day into a permanent holiday. This holiday was an opportunity of Buddhist monasteries to flaunt their collected wealth and attract donors, especially by methods of drawing crowds with dramatic spectacles and performances.
Fifteenth Day of the Eighth Moon; this festival (today simply called the Moon Festival or Mid-Autumn Festival), took place in mid autumn, and was designated as a three-day vacation for government officials. Unlike the previous holiday's association with Buddhism, this holiday was associated with Taoism, specifically Taoist alchemy. There was a tale about a hare on the moon who worked hard grinding ingredients for an elixir by using a mortar and pestle. In folklore, a magician escorted Emperor Illustrious August to the palace of the moon goddess across a silver bridge that was conjured up by him tossing his staff into the air. In the tale, on the fifteenth day of the eighth moon, the emperor viewed the performance of "Air of the Rainbow Robe and Feathered Skirt" by immortal maids. He memorized the music, and on his return to earth taught it to his performers. For people in Chang'an (and elsewhere), this holiday was a means for many to simply feast and drink for the night.
Ninth Day of the Ninth Moon; this was a three-day holiday associated with the promotion of longevity (with chrysanthemum as the main symbol). It was a holiday where many sought to have picnics out in the country, especially in higher elevated areas such as mountain sides. Without the ability to travel away to far off mountains, inhabitants of Chang'an simply held their feasts at the tops of pagodas or in the Serpentine River Park. Stems and leaves of chrysanthemum were added to fermented grains and were brewed for a year straight. On the same festival the following year, it was believed that drinking this ale would prolong one's life.
The Last Day of the Twelfth Moon; on this holiday ale and fruit were provided as offerings to the god of the stove, after having Buddhist or Taoist priests recite scripture at one's own home (if one had the wealth and means). Offerings were made to the stove god because it was his responsibility to make annual reports to heaven on the good deeds or sins committed by the family in question. A family would do everything to charm the god, including hanging a newly painted portrait of the god on a piece of paper above their stove on New Years, which hung in the same position for an entire year. It was a common practice to rub in some alcoholic beverage across the picture of the deities mouth, so that he would become drunk and far too inebriated to make any sort of reasonably bad or negative report about the family to heaven.
Grand Carnivals; carnivals during the Tang period were lively events, with great quantities of eating, drinking, street parades, and sideshow acts in tents. Carnivals had no fixed dates or customs, but were merely celebrations bestowed by the emperor in the case of his generosity or special circumstances such as great military victories, abundant harvests after a long drought or famine, sacrifices to gods, or the granting of grand amnesties. This type of carnival as a nationwide tradition was established long before the Tang by Qin Shihuang in the third century BC, upon his unification of China in 221. Between 628 and 758, the imperial throne bestowed a total of sixty nine different carnivals, seventeen of which were held under Empress Wu. These carnivals generally lasted 3 days, and sometimes five, seven, or nine days (using odd numbers due so that the number of days could correspond with beliefs in the cosmos). The carnival grounds were usually staged in the wide avenues of the city, and smaller parties in attendance in the open plazas of Buddhist monasteries. Carnivals of the Tang Dynasty featured large passing wagons with high poles were acrobats would climb and perform stunts for crowds. Large floats during the Tang, on great four-wheeled wagons, rose as high as five stories, called 'mountain carts' or 'drought boats'. These superstructure vehicles were draped in silken flags and cloths, with bamboo and other wooden type frames, foreign musicians dressed in rich fabrics sitting on the top playing music, and the whole cart drawn by oxen that were covered in tiger skins and outfitted to look like rhinoceroses and elephants. An official in charge of the Music Bureau in the early seventh century set to the task of composing the official music that was to be played in the grand carnival of the year. On some occasions the emperor granted prizes to those carnival performers he deemed to outshine the rest with their talents.
In 682, a culmination of major droughts, floods, locust plagues, and epidemics, a widespread famine broke out in the dual Chinese capital cities of Chang'an and Luoyang. The scarcity of food drove the price of grain to unprecedented heights of inflation, while a once prosperous era under emperors Taizong and Gaozong ended on a sad note.

Decline

The once prosperous Tang capital abruptly declined after the end of the Tang Dynasty. In 880, the rebel Huang Chao sacked the city, destroying much of it. When the warlord Zhu Wen attacked the city again 25 years later, the capital was moved from Chang'an to Luoyang, and much of the city was abandoned and fell into disrepair. Soon, most of the city was overrun by nature and was used for agriculture. The former imperial city was modified into a much smaller city. Then the northern and eastern city wall was expanded a little and the official name of city was changed from Jingzhao, which means capital city, to Xi'an in Ming Dynasty.

See also
Ancient Chinese urban planning
Historical capitals of China
List of cities in China
Silk Road transmission of Buddhism
Xi Ming Temple
Xi'an
History of Xi'an

References

Citations

Sources

Benn, Charles (2002). China's Golden Age: Everyday Life in the Tang Dynasty. Oxford: Oxford University Press. .
Ebrey, Walthall, Palais (2006). East Asia: A Cultural, Social, and Political History. Boston: Houghton Mifflin Company. .
Needham, Joseph (1986). Science and Civilization in China: Volume 4, Physics and Physical Technology, Part 2, Mechanical Engineering. Taipei: Caves Books Ltd.
Ma, Dezhi. "Sui Daxing Tang Chang'an Cheng Yizhi" ("Archeological Site of Sui's Daxing and Tang's Chang'an". Encyclopedia of China (Archeology Edition), 1st ed.
Rockhill (1899): The Land of the Lamas: Notes of a Journey Through China, Mongolia and Tibet. William Woodville Rockhill. Longmans, Green and Co., London. Reprint: Winsome Books, Delhi, 2005. .
Xue, Pingshuan. 五代宋元时期古都长安商业的兴衰演变.
Wang, Chongshu. "Han Chang'an Cheng Yizhi" ("Archeological Site of Han's Chang'an"). Encyclopedia of China (Archeology Edition), 1st ed.

Further reading
Thilo, Thomas (2016), "Chang'an: China's Gateway to the Silk Road", in: Lieu, Samuel N.C., & Mikkelsen, Gunner B., Between Rome and China: History, Religions and Material Culture of the Silk Road (Silk Road Studies, XVIII), Turnhout, 2016, p. 91-112
Cotterell, Arthur (2007). The Imperial Capitals of China: An Inside View of the Celestial Empire. Pimlico. . 304 pages.
Schafer, Edward H. "The Last Years of Ch'ang'an". Oriens Extremus X (1963):133-179.
Sirén, O. "Tch'angngan au temps des Souei et des T'ang". Revue des Arts Asiatiques 4 (1927):46-104.
Steinhardt, Nancy Shatzman (1999). Chinese Imperial City Planning. Honolulu: University of Hawaii Press.
Xiong, Victor Cunrui (2000). Sui-Tang Chang'an: A Study in the Urban History of Medieval China. Ann Arbor: University of Michigan Center for Chinese Studies.

External links
Introduction of Xi'an/Chang'an by the University of Washington

Ancient Chinese capitals
Han dynasty
History of Xi'an
Major National Historical and Cultural Sites in Shaanxi
Populated places along the Silk Road
Sites along the Silk Road
Sui dynasty
Tang dynasty
Xin dynasty